Football at the 2015 Military World Games is held in Mungyeong, South Korea from 30 September to 10 October. The competition is also considered as a part of the World Military Cup.

Venues
Below the list of different venues of the football tournament.

Medal summary

Results

Medal table

References

External links
Football tournament of the 6th Military World Games - Official website of the 2015 Military World Games

Football
2015
2015
2015 in South Korean football